This is a list of universities in Montenegro.

Public
 University of Montenegro, Podgorica

Private
 University of Donja Gorica, Podgorica
 Mediterranean University, Podgorica

Private faculties
 Faculty of Business and Tourism, Budva
 Faculty of Management in Traffic & Communications, Budva
 Faculty of Management, Herceg Novi
 Faculty of State and European Studies, Podgorica
 Faculty of Mediterranean Business Studies, Tivat

References

Montenegro
Education in Montenegro
Universities